Kenhorst  is a borough in Berks County, Pennsylvania, United States. The population was 2,877 at the 2010 census.

Geography
Kenhorst is located in central Berks County at  (40.308092, -75.944042). It is bordered by the city of Reading to the north and east and by Cumru Township to the south and west, including the census-designated place of Grill to the southeast.

Transportation

Pennsylvania Route 625 follows New Holland Road on a north-south alignment through the heart of Kenhorst. U.S. Route 222 Business follows Lancaster Avenue along a northeast-southwest alignment along the northwest edge of the borough. Pennsylvania Route 724 follows Philadelphia Avenue on an east-west alignment along the south edge of the borough.

Demographics

As of the census of 2000, there were 2,679 people, 1,215 households, and 789 families living in the borough. The population density was 4,551.8 people per square mile (1,753.2/km2). There were 1,254 housing units at an average density of 2,130.6 per square mile (820.6/km2). The racial makeup of the borough was 95.86% White, 0.82% African American, 0.04% Native American, 1.61% Asian, 1.05% from other races, and 0.63% from two or more races. Hispanic or Latino of any race were 2.02% of the population.

There were 1,215 households, out of which 22.2% had children under the age of 18 living with them, 53.9% were married couples living together, 8.4% had a female householder with no husband present, and 35.0% were non-families. 30.0% of all households were made up of individuals, and 14.0% had someone living alone who was 65 years of age or older. The average household size was 2.20 and the average family size was 2.72.

In the borough the population was spread out, with 18.4% under the age of 18, 4.3% from 18 to 24, 29.9% from 25 to 44, 22.8% from 45 to 64, and 24.6% who were 65 years of age or older. The median age was 43 years. For every 100 females there were 93.7 males. For every 100 females age 18 and over, there were 91.2 males.

The median income for a household in the borough was $40,452, and the median income for a family was $44,762. Males had a median income of $37,243 versus $27,162 for females. The per capita income for the borough was $21,379. About 6.1% of families and 7.9% of the population were below the poverty line, including 12.0% of those under age 18 and 14.1% of those age 65 or over.

Gallery

References

External links

Borough of Kenhorst official website

Populated places established in 1931
Boroughs in Berks County, Pennsylvania
1931 establishments in Pennsylvania